Everything Happens for a Reason is a 2004 novel by Kavita Daswani, published by HarperCollins.

Plot
Priya has married a handsome young Indian man living in America. Though she has moved from Delhi to Los Angeles - land of Hollywood excess and celebrity craziness - she still lives the life of an obedient Hindu wife: cooking, cleaning and obeying her in-laws in all things.

So when her mother-in-law suggests that she goes out to work, Priya is a little surprised. But not half as surprised as her husband and his family would be if they knew the reality of her new job. Because Priya has just become the hottest, most in demand and most envied showbiz reporter in Hollywood. And her husband and his family would not approve.

External links
 Asian Review of Books

Novels by Kavita Daswani
2004 American novels
Hollywood novels
HarperCollins books
Indian diaspora in fiction